Wayne Steinhauer (born August 8, 1956) is an American businessman and politician.

A Republican, he was appointed to the South Dakota House of Representatives in November 2015, representing District 9.

References 

1958 births
Living people
Republican Party South Dakota state senators
Republican Party members of the South Dakota House of Representatives
People from Hartford, South Dakota
21st-century American politicians